Aghuzbon or Aghoozbon or Aghowzbon may refer to:
 Aghuzbon, Rudbar, Gilan Province
 Aghuzbon Kand Sar, Rudsar County, Gilan Province
 Aghuzbon, Siahkal, Gilan Province
 Aghuzbon, Amol, Mazandaran Province
 Aghuzbon, Babol, Mazandaran Province
 Aghuzbon, Savadkuh, Mazandaran Province